Olof Viktor Detlof Guterstam (born 4 January 1983) is a Swedish former professional footballer who played as a striker. He spent most of his career at IF Brommapojkarna, but also represented FC Brussels, Hammarby IF, IK Frej, and Älvsjö AIK FF during a career that spanned between 2002 and 2012. He won two caps for the Sweden national football team in 2007.

Club career

Early career 
Guterstam arrived at Brommapojkarna in 2002, having previously played for Enskede IK and Älvsjö AIK as a midfielder and as a winger. At Brommapojkarna he was retrained to be a striker, at the initiative of the then manager of the team, Benny Persson.

Brommapojkarna 
Guterstam was the joint top scorer of the 2006 Superettan season with 17 goals, alongside Falkenbergs FF's Stefan Rodevåg. He was also instrumental in taking Brommapojkarna to Allsvenskan, the highest division in Swedish football, scoring two goals in the qualifiers against BK Häcken in November 2006.
He played 25 games with Brommapojkarna in Allsvenskan and scored 4 goals. Brommapojkarna finished last in Allsvenskan and the club was relegated to Superettan.

Loan to FC Brussels 
Instead of following the club to Superettan, Guterstam signed a half-year loan contract with a Belgian club, FC Brussels. Guterstam scored 4 goals in 14 games for the Belgian club.

Loan to Hammarby IF 
In May 2008, Guterstam returned to Brommapojkarna. Shortly after his return he signed a half-year loan contract, with an option of a permanent transfer, with Swedish club Hammarby IF. After a poor start with the club, he improved and eventually managed to score two goals. Despite his improvement, Hammarby did not choose to buy him after the contract expired.

Later career and retirement 
On 25 December 2010, Guterstam left IF Brommapojkarna after 8 years at the club and signed a two-year contract with IK Frej, who had just been promoted to Division 1 Norra. He finished up his competitive footballing career by playing a season for his boyhood club Älvsjö AIK in Division 3.

In 2014, Guterstam was inducted into Brommapojkarna's Hall of Fame.

International career
Guterstam was called up to the Sweden national team for the first time for their South American tour in January 2007. He made his international debut in a 2–1 loss against Ecuador. He won his second and last international cap four days later, when Sweden lost 2–0 to Venezuela.

Personal life
In the beginning of his professional football career, Guterstam also attended medical school at Karolinska Institutet in order to become a physician. Following his retirement from professional football, he took up his medical studies again after a 4-year hiatus. Guterstam currently serves as a medical specialist at Stureby clinic.

Career statistics

Club

International

Honours 
Individual
 Superettan top scorer: 2006 (shared with Stefan Rodevåg)
 IF Brommapojkarna Hall of Fame: 2014

References

External links 
 

1983 births
Living people
Association football forwards
Swedish footballers
Sweden international footballers
Allsvenskan players
Superettan players
Ettan Fotboll players
Division 3 (Swedish football) players
Belgian Pro League players
IF Brommapojkarna players
R.W.D.M. Brussels F.C. players
Hammarby Fotboll players
Expatriate footballers in Belgium
Enskede IK players
Footballers from Stockholm